The Richardson Symphony Orchestra (RSO) is an American symphony orchestra based in Richardson, Texas. The orchestra is resident at the Charles W. Eisemann Center for Performing Arts.

History 
The orchestra was founded in 1961.

Maestro Clay Couturiaux has served as the music director and conductor since 2012; he took over for Anshel Brusilow after his retirement.

Music directors 

 Chris Xeros (1961–1992)
 Anshel Brusilow (1992–2012)
 Clay Couturiaux (2012–present)

References

External links 

 Richardson Symphony Orchestra official website
 Musicians of the RSO

Orchestras based in Texas
Texas classical music
Musical groups established in 1961